Women in Switzerland are women who live in and are from Switzerland. The legal and social role of Swiss women has evolved significantly from the mid-20th century onwards.

Patriarchal views
Tradition dictates that the place of Swiss women is in the home in charge of housework and child care. Being in a society with strong patriarchal roots, Swiss tradition also places women under the authority of their fathers and their husbands. Such adherence to patriarchal donchanged and improved when the women of Switzerland gained their right to vote at the federal level on February 7, 1971. However, despite of gaining status of having equal rights with men, some Swiss women still have to be able to attain education beyond the post-secondary level, thus they earn less money than men, and they occupy lower-level job positions. According to swissinfo.ch in 2011, Switzerland's State Secretariat for Economic Affairs (Seco) were encouraging business companies to "appoint more women to top-level positions". Those who are already working in business companies, according to same report, mentions that "women earn on average 20% less than men" in Switzerland, and the ratio was 6 out of 10 women were working part-time.

Prominent Swiss women in the fields of business and law include Emilie Kempin-Spyri (1853–1901), the first woman to graduate with a law degree and to be accepted as an academic lecturer in the country, and Isabelle Welton, the head of IBM Switzerland and one of few women in the country to hold a top-level position in a business firm.

Suffrage

Women obtained the right to vote in national elections in 1971. Women obtained the right to vote at local canton level between 1959 (the cantons of Vaud and Neuchâtel in that year) and 1991 (the canton of Appenzell Innerrhoden).

Marriage and family life
Family life has been traditionally patriarchal, following the model of a male breadwinner and a female housewife. In Europe, Switzerland was one  of the last countries to establish gender equality in marriage: married women's rights were severely restricted until 1988, when legal reforms providing gender equality in marriage, abolishing the legal authority of the husband, came into force (these reforms had been approved in 1985 by voters in a referendum, who narrowly voted in favor with 54.7% of voters approving). Adultery was decriminalized in 1989. In 1992, the law was changed to end discrimination against married women with regard to national citizenship. Marital rape was criminalized in 1992, and in 2004 it became a state offense in Switzerland. Divorce laws were also reformed in 2000 and 2005. In 2013, further reforms to the civil code followed, removing the remaining discriminatory provisions regarding the spouses' choice of family name and cantonal citizenship law.

Until the late 20th century, most cantons had regulations banning unmarried cohabitation of couples. The last canton to end such prohibition was Valais, in 1995. As of 2015, 22.5% of births were to unmarried women.

Employment
Women face significant struggles with regards to work for pay. Although most women are employed, many are so on a part-time basis or in marginal employment. The view that women, especially married women, should not work full-time remains prevalent. Among the OECD, only the Netherlands has more women working part-time. Although the law no longer requires the husband's consent for a wife's work, in job interviews women are often asked for it. Taxation penalizing dual-income families exists in some cantons. The OECD has stated that "The lack of family-friendly policy and workplace support makes it very difficult for many Swiss parents, usually mothers, to combine work and family life". The OECD has also urged Switzerland to end the practice of irregular and interrupted school hours which makes it difficult for mothers to work; and to revise its tax and supplementary benefits policies. Despite all these, women have a legal right to work and to not be discriminated in the workforce, under the 1996 equality law. In 2005, paid maternity leave was introduced in Switzerland, after voters approved it in a referendum. Four previous attempts to secure it had previously failed at the ballot box.

Violence against women
As in other Western countries, the 1990s and the 21st century saw reforms with regard to laws on domestic violence. Marital rape was made illegal in 1992, and since 2004 marital rape is prosecutable ex-officio (meaning it can be prosecuted even if the victim does not file an official complaint). Switzerland also ratified the Council of Europe Convention on Action against Trafficking in Human Beings in 2012, and the Istanbul Convention in 2017.

Fertility and reproductive rights

The maternal mortality rate in Switzerland is 5.00 deaths/100,000 live births (as of 2015). Abortion laws were liberalized in 2002. Abortion is legal during the first trimester, upon condition of counseling, for women who state that they are in distress; and at later stages for medical reasons. The total fertility rate is 1.56 children born/per woman (est. of 2018) which is below the replacement rate of 2.1.

Politics
In 2010, The New York Times reported that women became the majority within the Swiss government, with women holding 4 out of the Federal Council's 7 ministerial positions.

Below is a list of women to serve in, or as president of, the Federal Council:

 Elisabeth Kopp became the first female member of the Federal Council (1984-1989)
 Ruth Dreifuss served on the Federal Council (1993-2002); she served as the first ever President of the Swiss Confederation (1999)
 Ruth Metzler-Arnold served as a member of the Federal Council (1999-2003) 
 Micheline Calmy-Rey served as a member of the Federal Council (2003-2011) and as President of the Swiss Confederation (2007, 2011)
 Eveline Widmer-Schlumpf served as a member of the Federal Council (2007-2015) and as President of the Swiss Confederation (2012)
 Doris Leuthard served as a member of the Federal Council (2006-2018) and as President of the Swiss Confederation (2010, 2017)

 Simonetta Sommaruga serves as a member of the Federal Council (2010-Present) and served as the President of the Swiss Confederation (2015, 2020)
 Viola Amherd serves as a member of the Federal Council (2019-Present) 
 Karin Keller-Sutter serves as a member of the Federal Council (2019-Present)

Non-sexist use of languages

The Federal Administration of Switzerland regularly uses three languages: German, French and Italian (Rhaeto-Romanic, or Romansh, is used less regularly). An article by Daniel Elmiger states that, "the new Federal Language Law (Sprachengesetz, Loi sur les langues, Legge sulle lingue, Lescha da linguas) adopted in 2007 demands that official language use [for official texts] must be adequate, clear and intelligible as well as non-sexist. Non-sexist language has been required in the German section of the Federal Chancellery for about 15 years, whereas the French and Italian sections have shown little interest in modifying their use of language, sticking to a more traditional language use in which masculine terms are used both specifically as well as generically."

Women’s strikes
The 1991 Swiss women's strike for women’s rights was organised 10 years after the acceptance by the Swiss population of the constitutional article on the equality between women and men on June 14th, 1981. The 2019 Swiss women's strike for women’s rights was held the same day of the year as the 1991 strike.

See also
 Women's suffrage in Switzerland

References

External links

 Switzerland, eDiplomat

 
Switzerland